Pascua Florida (pronounced ) is a Spanish term that means "flowery festival" or "feast of flowers" and is an annual celebration of Juan Ponce de León's arrival in what is now the state of Florida. While the holiday is normally celebrated on April 2, it can fall on any date between the latter parts of March and the first week of April, depending on the day of the week April 2 falls on and/or the Governor's discretion. Pascua Florida Day is a state holiday.

Background

Juan Ponce de León is the first known European to discover the area that is now known as Florida. His successful discovery of Puerto Rico during one of many Spanish expeditions for gold, mystical items and new lands, precipitated Spain's permission and encouragement to claim more lands in the new world. One such mystical item that lured him to what eventually happened to be Florida, was the Fountain of Youth.

Juan Ponce de León became governor of Puerto Rico during the early 1500s. The natives told him of an island that was rich in gold and had a magical fountain of water which would renew a person's health and youth. Intrigued, Ponce de Leon returned to Spain to seek the approval of the Spanish crown to search and explore the island, known by natives as Bimini. On February 23 of 1512, King Ferdinand approved Ponce de Leon's request to search for the island and by the 3rd of March in 1513, three ships left the Port of San German in Puerto Rico to search for the island of Bimini. He landed on Floridian shores some time during April 2 to April 8 and named the area "la Florida" in honor of "Pascua Florida", Spain's Easter time celebration. The expedition believed their discovery to be a large island and Ponce de Leon named the 'island' Pascua Florida.

History of Holiday

History and Significance
Pascua Florida Day commemorates the arrival of Juan Ponce de León on the shores of the state of Florida in 1513. Florida is now known as the "Flower State" because of the connection to Ponce de Leon and Pascua Florida. Since its entry into legislature, the holiday, while having no specific celebratory acts, usually culminates in a period of retrospection of Florida's rich history and the preceding events that led to it.

Celebration
Pascua Florida Day is only celebrated in Florida. The holiday was adopted into Florida law on April 2 of 1953 at the suggestion of Mary A. Harrell, a Social Studies teacher in Jacksonville, Florida. From that point on, the week within which the holiday falls, usually March 27 to April 2, is dubbed Pascua Florida Week to honor Florida's history, and school children and adults alike, are urged to observe the time by partaking in commemorative exercises and programs.

Pascua Florida Day
Pascua Florida Day is usually celebrated on April 2 (the day on which Ponce de León first spotted Florida) unless it falls on a weekend, in which case the governor may declare either the preceding Friday or the following Monday as the state day. The Governor of Florida may issue an annual proclamation designating April 2 as the state day and designating the week of March 27 to April 2 as "Pascua Florida Week" and calling upon public schools and citizens of Florida to observe the same as a patriotic occasion.

References
Florida Statutes, Section 683.06
Definitions for pascua

Festivals in Spain
History of Florida
Juan Ponce de León
American toponymy